Soma Ghosh is an Indian performer. In 2016, she was awarded Padma Shri by the Indian Government for her contribution in arts.

Early life and education 
Ghosh was born and brought up in Benaras. Her parents are Archana Chakravarty and Shri Madan Mohan Chakravarty. She did her graduation in literature from Benaras Hindu University. She did her higher education in music with a master's degree and PhD in Hindu Classical Music.

Career 
Ghosh is specialised in Benaras singing like Thumri, Tappa, Hori, Chaiti, Kajari, Dadra and Ghazal. She is the brand ambassador of Beti Bachao Beti Padao Initiative. She is also a founder of the NGO called Madhu Murchhana.

Albums

Awards 
Padma Shri in 2016

References 

Living people
Recipients of the Padma Shri in arts
Musicians from Varanasi
Year of birth missing (living people)